A special election was held in  on November 27, 1806, to fill a vacancy left by the resignation of Michael Leib (DR) on February 14, 1806.

Election results

Porter took his seat December 8, 1806

See also
 List of special elections to the United States House of Representatives

References

Pennsylvania 1806 01
Pennsylvania 1806 01
1806 01
Pennsylvania 01
United States House of Representatives 01
United States House of Representatives 1806 01